Froriepia are a genus of flowering plants in the umbellifer family Apiaceae, native to the Caucasus region, including Russia, Georgia, Armenia, Azerbaijan, Turkey and Iran. They prefer to live in scrubby areas, in meadows, and on forest edges.

The genus name of Froriepia is in honour of Ludwig Friedrich von Froriep (1779–1847), a German doctor, professor of medicine and anatomy in Jena and Halle. It was first described and published in Linnaea Vol.16 on page 362 in 1842.

Species
Currently accepted species include:

Froriepia gracillima Leute (dubious)
Froriepia subpinnata (Ledeb.) Baill.

References 

Apiaceae
Apiaceae genera
Plants described in 1842
Flora of the Caucasus
Flora of Turkey
Flora of Iran
Taxa named by Karl Koch